Tateiwa Dam is an earthfill dam located in Ehime Prefecture in Japan. The dam is used for irrigation. The catchment area of the dam is 6.8 km2. The dam impounds about 6  ha of land when full and can store 802 thousand cubic meters of water. The construction of the dam was started on 1973 and completed in 1980.

References

Dams in Ehime Prefecture
1980 establishments in Japan